Scott Burns may refer to:

Scott Burns (footballer) (born 1974), Australian rules footballer 
Scott Burns (geologist) (born 1940), American geologist at Portland State University
Scott Burns (newspaper columnist), American journalist
Scott Burns (record producer),  American computer engineer and music producer
Scott Z. Burns (born 1962), American screenwriter, producer, and director

See also
Scott Byrne, musician